Melanie Pfeifer (born 25 August 1986 in Frankfurt) is a German slalom canoeist who competed at the international level from 2003 to 2016.

She won four medals at the ICF Canoe Slalom World Championships with a silver (K1 team: 2010) and three bronzes (K1: 2014, 2015; K1 team: 2011). She also won 7 medals at the European Championships (3 golds, 3 silvers, and 1 bronze). At the 2016 Summer Olympics in Rio de Janeiro, she competed in the K1 event where she finished in 7th place.

World Cup individual podiums

References

 - accessed 11 September 2010.

External links
 
 
 

1986 births
Living people
German female canoeists
Olympic canoeists of Germany
Canoeists at the 2016 Summer Olympics
Medalists at the ICF Canoe Slalom World Championships
Sportspeople from Frankfurt